Cornelis "Cock" van der Tuijn (24 July 1924 – 23 August 1974) was a Dutch footballer. He competed in the men's tournament at the 1948 Summer Olympics.

References

External links
 

1924 births
1974 deaths
Dutch footballers
Netherlands international footballers
Olympic footballers of the Netherlands
Footballers at the 1948 Summer Olympics
Footballers from Schiedam
Hermes DVS players
Association football midfielders